Delias jordani is a butterfly in the family Pieridae. It was described by George Hamilton Kenrick in 1909. It is found in New Guinea (Arfak Mountains). The name honours Karl Jordan.

References

External links
Delias at Markku Savela's Lepidoptera and Some Other Life Forms

jordani
Butterflies described in 1909